Hebron Academy in Brandon, Mississippi, also known as Rock Hill School, was built during 1860–61.  It was listed on the National Register of Historic Places in 1978.

It was deemed significant as "a rare example of nineteenth century vernacular masonry architecture....one of the earliest
and most unusual extant rural school buildings in the state."

References

School buildings on the National Register of Historic Places in Mississippi
School buildings completed in 1860
National Register of Historic Places in Rankin County, Mississippi
Schools in Rankin County, Mississippi